Jantine Annika Heij (born September 21, 1990) is a songwriter, vocalist, keyboardist and producer from the Netherlands.

Early life 
She graduated with honours from Codarts University of the Arts in 2012.

Career 
She has worked with Skrillex, Hardwell, Exo, NCT 127, Monsta X, Rock Mafia and released songs on Spinnin' Records, Universal Music Group, SM Entertainment and more.

Recognition 

Jantine received a platinum award and a 2017 Buma Award for co-writing All Night Long, performed by Dutch artist Rochelle.

She reached a Billboard Album Chart no. 1 position with NCT 127's second mini album Limitless, which debuted at a no.1 position in the South-Korean Gaon Album Chart Limitless exceeded 120.000 physical sales.

More Billboard Album Chart success was obtained with Luna's debut album, Free Somebody.

Discography

References 

Living people
Dutch musicians
Dutch songwriters
1990 births